Roger Jackson (born August 19, 1989) is an American football wide receiver who is currently a free agent. He played college football at Arkansas Tech University.

Early life
Jackson attended L.W. Higgins High School, in Jefferson Parish, Louisiana, until his sophomore year, when Hurricane Katrina struck, forcing him out of his home. He and his family relocated to Siloam Springs, Arkansas, where he attended Siloam Springs High School. While at Silom Springs, Jackson played both football and basketball, where he helped the Panthers win the 5A state championship in 2008.

College career
Jackson signed to play college football at Arkansas Tech University. As a senior in 2013, Jackson had 23 receptions for 239 yards and 3 touchdowns.

Professional career

Iowa Barnstormers
On February 20, 2014, Jackson was assigned to the Iowa Barnstormers of the Arena Football League, he participated in camp with the Barnstormers, but was reassigned prior to the beginning of the season.

Trenton Freedom
Two days after his release from the Barnstormers, Trenton Freedom offensive coordinator, Ryan Vena, called Jackson and signed him. Jackson's play earned him the Professional Indoor Football League's Offensive Rookie of the Year.

New Orleans VooDoo
After starting the 2015 season with the Freedom, Jackson was assigned to the New Orleans VooDoo on April 30, 2015. Jackson would play only 11 games as a rookie for the Voodoo with those 11 games he broke the franchise rookie record held by Kenny Henderson in 2007 by 29 yards having 924 yards with 74 catches his rookie season. When the VooDoo ceased operations on August 9, 2015, Jackson became a free agent.

Jacksonville Sharks
On October 16, 2015, Jackson was assigned to the Jacksonville Sharks.

Washington Valor
Jackson was assigned to the Washington Valor on January 10, 2017.

Jersey Flight
On February 2, 2020, Jackson signed with the Jersey Flight. The 2020 National Arena League season was canceled due to the Covid-19 pandemic.

References

External links

Arkansas Tech bio
Arena Football bio

Living people
1989 births
American football wide receivers
Arkansas Tech Wonder Boys football players
Iowa Barnstormers players
Trenton Freedom players
New Orleans VooDoo players
Jacksonville Sharks players
Washington Valor players
Players of American football from Louisiana
People from Marrero, Louisiana